Basiliscus is a genus of large corytophanid lizards, commonly known as basilisks, which are endemic to southern Mexico, Central America, and northern South America. The genus contains four species, which are commonly known as the Jesus Christ lizard, or simply the Jesus lizard, due to their ability to run across water for significant distances before sinking due to the large surface area of their feet.

Taxonomy and etymology
Both the generic name, Basiliscus, and the common name, "basilisk", derive from the Greek basilískos (βασιλίσκος) meaning "little king". The specific epithet, vittatus, which is Latin for "striped", was given in Carl Linnaeus' 10th edition of Systema Naturae.

Physiology
Basilisks  on average measure  in total length (including tail). Their growth is perpetual, fast when they are young and nonlinear for mature basilisks. Their long crest-like sails, reinforced in three distinct points (head, back, and tail), confer the impression of creatures such as Dimetrodon and Edaphosaurus. Their skin is shed in pieces.

Running on water
Basilisks sometimes run bipedally. Basilisks have the ability to "run" on water, and because of this, they have been dubbed the "Jesus Christ lizard" in reference to the biblical passage of Matthew 14:22-34. Flaps between their toes help support basilisks, creating a larger surface and pockets of air, giving them the buoyancy needed to run across water.

A similar behavior, running bipedally across water, is known from the sailfin lizards and a few species of anole lizards. Basilisks and sailfin lizards share the specialized  toe fringes, which however are lacking in the anoles.

Other defense mechanisms
Basilisks can burrow into sand to hide from predators; a ring of muscles around both nostrils prevents sand from entering the nose.

Habitat and geographic range
Basilisks are abundant in the tropical rain forests of Central and South America, from southern Mexico to Ecuador and Venezuela.

Invasive species
The species Basiliscus vittatus (brown basilisk) has been introduced to Florida. It has adapted to the colder winters by burrowing into leaf litter for warmth. Current reports sight the brown basilisk as far north as Fort Pierce, on the state's East Coast, where small groups have crept up the North Fork of the Saint Lucie River. Mainly it has been seen in Boca Raton and other cities in Palm Beach County. as seen in this photo taken in West Palm Beach, Florida.

Classification
Genus Basiliscus
Basiliscus basiliscus  – common basilisk
Basiliscus galeritus  – red-headed basilisk
Basiliscus plumifrons  – plumed basilisk
Basiliscus vittatus  – brown basilisk, striped basilisk

Extant species

References

External links
Jesus Lizard Robot An attempt at building a robotic version of the Jesus Lizard
How "Jesus Lizards" Walk on Water
Jesus Lizards Walk on Water Video

Further reading
Boulenger GA (1885). Catalogue of the Lizards in the British Museum (Natural History). Second Edition. Volume II. Iguanidæ ... London: Trustees of the British Museum (Natural History). (Taylor and Francis, printers). xiii + 497 pp. + Plates I-XXIV. (Genus Basiliscus, pp. 106–107).
Laurenti JN (1768). Specimen medicum, exhibens synopsin reptilium emendatam cum experimentis circa venena et antidota reptilium austriacorum. Vienna: Joan. Thom. Nob. de Trattnern. 214 pp. + Plates I-V. (Basiliscus, new genus, p. 50). (in Latin).

Basiliscus
Taxa named by Josephus Nicolaus Laurenti
Lizard genera